Mohsin Nazar Khan (born 1 January 1928) is a Pakistani former hurdler. He competed in the men's 400 metres hurdles at the 1948 Summer Olympics.

References

External links
 

1928 births
Possibly living people
Athletes (track and field) at the 1948 Summer Olympics
Pakistani male hurdlers
Olympic athletes of Pakistan
Place of birth missing (living people)